The Vail Daily is a newspaper in Eagle County, Colorado. Its primary digital platform is VailDaily.com, and it also publishes a 15,000-circulation, free-distribution newspaper seven days a week. The newspaper covers the Colorado communities of Vail, Avon, Edwards, Beaver Creek, and Minturn, the area ski resorts, and greater Eagle County.

Publishers
The Vail Daily was founded in 1981 by Jim Pavelich and Jon Van Housen. It is published by Colorado Mountain News Media, a division of Swift Communications in Reno, Nevada. Swift Communications owns and operates daily news organizations in other Western U.S. mountain resort communities, including Aspen, Breckenridge, Winter Park, Steamboat Springs, Park City, and Lake Tahoe.

References

External links 
Vail Daily Website
Swift Communications (official website)
Colorado Mountain News Media

Newspapers published in Colorado
Eagle County, Colorado
Free daily newspapers